Phoma cucurbitacearum is a fungal plant pathogen infecting cucurbits.

References

External links 
 Index Fungorum
 USDA ARS Fungal Database

Fungal plant pathogens and diseases
Vegetable diseases
Cucurbitaceae
cucurbitacearum
Fungi described in 1823